Jákup á Borg (born 26 October 1979) is a Faroese football manager and former footballer (midfielder or striker) He last played for Faroe Islands Premier League team B36 Tórshavn where he now is manager.

Club career
Once hailed as Faroe Islands biggest talent, he made his debut in Faroese football with B36 Tórshavn as a defender on 28 April 1996 and soon became a prolific striker. His goals earned him trials at Liverpool and Watford and eventually a loan move to Danish league side Odense BK but he returned home after only one unsuccessful season. á Borg was Faroese league top goalscorer in the 1998 and 1999 seasons.

In 2006, Borg was named the Faroese Premier League Footballer of the Year. In 2015, he started his 20th season in the Faroese league.

á Borg became the Faroese Premier League leading goal scorer on 12 April 2015 when he scored his 148th goal, in his 20th season in the Faroese league.

International career
á Borg made his debut for the Faroe Islands in an August 1998 European Championship qualifying match against Bosnia. He has earned 62 caps, scoring 2 goals and has represented his country in 23 FIFA World Cup qualification matches. He usually played on the right wing for the national team.

He announced his retirement from International football in July 2010 and had final appearance in a Faroese shirt against Estonia in August 2010. However, in early 2012 he made himself available for a possible selection again.

International goals
Scores and results list Faroe Islands' goal tally first.

References

External links
 
 Profile at Odense BK
 Profile at HB Torshavn

1979 births
Living people
People from Tórshavn
Association football wingers
Faroese footballers
Faroe Islands international footballers
Odense Boldklub players
B36 Tórshavn players
Havnar Bóltfelag players
Faroe Islands youth international footballers